Green Cross Health is a provider of primary health care services around New Zealand, including pharmacies and medical clinics. It is based in Ellerslie, Auckland.

The company is publicly listed on the New Zealand Stock Exchange (NZX : GXH). As well as providing support to 357 Life and Unichem pharmacies throughout New Zealand (with equity in around a quarter of them), Green Cross Health also has a Medical Division and a Community Health Services Division. The Medical Division provides complete family healthcare services through GP and accident and medical centers, with most operating under The Doctors brand. The company has 45 offices throughout New Zealand.

The Green Cross Health Community Health Division provides home health care to around 21,000 people through Access Community Health.

Brands

Unichem

Unichem is a pharmacy franchise selling a range of medications, skincare, cosmetics, gifts and other products.

It has 287 stores, including 111 in Auckland.

The Unichem brand was first launched in 1981.

Life Pharmacy

Life Pharmacy (sometimes stylised as life Pharmacy) is a pharmacy chain selling a wide selection of cosmetics and skincare, alongside medications, natural health products and gifts.

The chain was established in 1995, and had 21 stores in 2004.

There are now 65 stores, including 23 in Auckland.

References

Health care companies of New Zealand
Companies listed on the New Zealand Exchange
Pharmacy brands